Hydroxyphenethylamine may refer to:

 Phenylethanolamine (β-hydroxyphenethylamine)
 meta-Tyramine (3-hydroxyphenethylamine)
 Tyramine (4-hydroxyphenethylamine)